Martin Podešva (born December 16, 1988) is a Czech professional ice hockey player currently playing for HC 07 Detva in the Tipsport Liga.

Career
Podešva began his career with HC Vsetín and made his debut for the senior team during the 2006–07 Czech Extraliga season where he played three games.

On April 19, 2013, Podešva joined Orli Znojmo of the Erste Bank Eishockey Liga  He then moved to PSG Berani Zlín on May 2, 2016 but later rejoined Orli Znojmo on December 5, 2016 to aid their sickness crisis having had five senior players of sick leave.

References

External links

1988 births
Living people
Czech ice hockey centres
HC 07 Detva players
HC Havířov players
Hokej Šumperk 2003 players
LHK Jestřábi Prostějov players
HC Oceláři Třinec players
Orli Znojmo players
People from Vsetín
HC ZUBR Přerov players
VHK Vsetín players
MsHK Žilina players
PSG Berani Zlín players
Sportspeople from the Zlín Region
Czech expatriate ice hockey players in Germany
Czech expatriate ice hockey players in Slovakia